Cradle of Liberty may refer to:
Cradle of Liberty Council
Faneuil Hall